Ricky Subagja (born 27 January 1971) is a former Indonesian badminton player. He was rated among the greatest doubles specialists in the sport's history.

Career
In 1993 the fast moving, faster hitting Subagja won men's doubles at the then biennial IBF World Championships in Birmingham, England with fellow countryman Rudy Gunawan. However, Subagja's regular partner for most of the 90s was another fellow countryman, the equally fast and hard-hitting Rexy Mainaky, and they formed the most successful team of the decade. Subagja and Mainaky won more than thirty international titles together, including all of badminton's major championships at least once. They captured Olympic gold at Atlanta in 1996, the IBF World Championships in 1995 at Lausanne, Switzerland (a repeat title for Subagja), and the prestigious All-England Championships back to back in 1995 and 1996. A partial listing of their other titles includes the open championships of the five strongest nations in men's badminton: China (1992), Indonesia (1993, 1994, 1998, 1999), Malaysia (1993, 1994, 1997), South Korea (1995, 1996), and Denmark (1998); as well as the World Badminton Grand Prix (1992, 1994, 1996), the Badminton World Cup (1993, 1995, 1997), and the quadrennial Asian Games (1994, 1998).

Subagja and Mainaky were bronze medalists at the 1997 IBF World Championships in Glasgow, Scotland. They were eliminated in the quarterfinals at both the 1992 Olympics in Barcelona and the 2000 Olympics in Sydney. They paired together on Indonesian Thomas Cup (men's international) teams that won four consecutive world team titles in 1994, 1996, 1998 and 2000

Awards and nominations

Achievements

Olympic Games 
Men's doubles

World Championships 
Men's doubles

World Cup 
Men's doubles

Asian Games 
Men's doubles

Asian Championships 
Men's doubles

Asian Cup 
Men's doubles

Southeast Asian Games 
Men's doubles

Mixed doubles

World Junior Championships 
The Bimantara World Junior Championships was an international invitation badminton tournament for junior players. It was held in Jakarta, Indonesia from 1987 to 1991.

Boys' singles

Boys' doubles

Mixed doubles

IBF World Grand Prix (28 titles, 11 runners-up)
The World Badminton Grand Prix sanctioned by International Badminton Federation (IBF) since 1983.

Men's doubles

 IBF Grand Prix tournament
 IBF Grand Prix Finals tournament

IBF International (1 title, 1 runners-up)
Men's doubles

References

External links
 Smash – Ricky Subagja
 Profile in Koni
 

1971 births
Living people
Indonesian Muslims
Sundanese people
Sportspeople from Bandung
Indonesian male badminton players
Badminton players at the 1992 Summer Olympics
Badminton players at the 1996 Summer Olympics
Badminton players at the 2000 Summer Olympics
Olympic badminton players of Indonesia
Olympic gold medalists for Indonesia
Olympic medalists in badminton
Medalists at the 1996 Summer Olympics
Badminton players at the 1994 Asian Games
Badminton players at the 1998 Asian Games
Asian Games gold medalists for Indonesia
Asian Games medalists in badminton
Medalists at the 1994 Asian Games
Medalists at the 1998 Asian Games
Southeast Asian Games gold medalists for Indonesia
Southeast Asian Games silver medalists for Indonesia
Southeast Asian Games bronze medalists for Indonesia
Southeast Asian Games medalists in badminton
Competitors at the 1991 Southeast Asian Games
Competitors at the 1993 Southeast Asian Games
Competitors at the 1995 Southeast Asian Games
Competitors at the 1997 Southeast Asian Games
World No. 1 badminton players